Trent West (born 17 October 1987) is a former professional Australian rules footballer who played for the Geelong Football Club and Brisbane Lions in the Australian Football League (AFL).

Career
West was recruited by the Geelong Football Club with their second selection and thirty-first overall in the 2005 national draft. He spent his first two season playing for Geelong's reserves in the Victorian Football League (VFL). He made his AFL debut in the nine-point win against the Port Adelaide Football Club in round one, 2008 at AAMI Stadium.

In October 2011, West was part of the Geelong premiership side which defeated the Collingwood Football Club by 38-points.

In the 2013 trade period, West was traded to the Brisbane Lions.

In August 2016, he announced he would retire from the AFL at the end of the season.

Statistics

|- style="background-color: #EAEAEA"
! scope="row" style="text-align:center" | 2006
|
| 12 || 0 || — || — || — || — || — || — || — || — || — || — || — || — || — || — || — || —
|-
! scope="row" style="text-align:center" | 2007
|
| 12 || 0 || — || — || — || — || — || — || — || — || — || — || — || — || — || — || — || —
|- style="background-color: #EAEAEA"
! scope="row" style="text-align:center" | 2008
|
| 12 || 6 || 1 || 0 || 6 || 29 || 35 || 13 || 10 || 37 || 0.2 || 0.0 || 1.0 || 4.8 || 5.8 || 2.2 || 1.7 || 6.2
|-
! scope="row" style="text-align:center" | 2009
|
| 12 || 1 || 0 || 0 || 0 || 0 || 0 || 0 || 0 || 16 || 0.0 || 0.0 || 0.0 || 0.0 || 0.0 || 0.0 || 0.0 || 16.0
|- style="background-color: #EAEAEA"
! scope="row" style="text-align:center" | 2010
|
| 12 || 4 || 2 || 3 || 9 || 23 || 32 || 11 || 8 || 49 || 0.5 || 0.8 || 2.3 || 5.8 || 8.0 || 2.8 || 2.0 || 12.3
|-
! scope="row" style="text-align:center" | 2011
|
| 12 || 9 || 7 || 2 || 51 || 32 || 83 || 25 || 36 || 183 || 0.8 || 0.2 || 5.7 || 3.6 || 9.2 || 2.8 || 4.0 || 20.3
|- style="background-color: #EAEAEA"
! scope="row" style="text-align:center" | 2012
|
| 12 || 21 || 8 || 7 || 103 || 112 || 215 || 59 || 52 || 518 || 0.4 || 0.3 || 4.9 || 5.3 || 10.2 || 2.8 || 2.5 || 24.7
|-
! scope="row" style="text-align:center" | 2013
|
| 12 || 13 || 5 || 3 || 76 || 51 || 127 || 23 || 12 || 278 || 0.4 || 0.2 || 5.8 || 3.9 || 9.8 || 1.8 || 0.9 || 21.4
|- style="background-color: #EAEAEA"
! scope="row" style="text-align:center" | 2014
|
| 13 || 10 || 4 || 0 || 56 || 49 || 105 || 30 || 22 || 240 || 0.4 || 0.0 || 5.6 || 4.9 || 10.5 || 3.0 || 2.2 || 24.0
|-
! scope="row" style="text-align:center" | 2015
|
| 13 || 2 || 1 || 0 || 6 || 0 || 6 || 4 || 2 || 12 || 0.5 || 0.0 || 3.0 || 0.0 || 3.0 || 2.0 || 1.0 || 6.0
|- style="background-color: #EAEAEA"
! scope="row" style="text-align:center" | 2016
|
| 13 || 4 || 0 || 1 || 14 || 22 || 36 || 9 || 8 || 82 || 0.0 || 0.3 || 3.5 || 5.5 || 9.0 || 2.3 || 2.0 || 20.5
|- class="sortbottom"
! colspan=3| Career
! 70
! 28
! 16
! 321
! 318
! 639
! 174
! 150
! 1415
! 0.4
! 0.2
! 4.6
! 4.5
! 9.1
! 2.5
! 2.1
! 20.2
|}

Honours and achievements
 Team
 AFL premiership (Geelong): 2011
 AFL McClelland Trophy (Geelong): 2008
 VFL premiership (Geelong): 2007
 TAC Cup premiership (Gippsland): 2005
 Individual
 Vic Country team representative honours in AFL Under 18 Championships: 2005

References

External links

Geelong Football Club players
Geelong Football Club Premiership players
Brisbane Lions players
1987 births
Living people
Australian rules footballers from Victoria (Australia)
Gippsland Power players
One-time VFL/AFL Premiership players